In My Bed may refer to:
 In My Bed (Dru Hill song), 1996
 In My Bed (Amy Winehouse song), 2004
 In My Bed (Sabrina Carpenter song), 2019